Billie Massey (born 21 March 2000) is a Belgian basketball player. She is part of the Belgian team in the women's tournament at the 2020 Summer Olympics.

References

External links
 
 
 

2000 births
Living people
Basketball players at the 2020 Summer Olympics
Belgian women's basketball players
Olympic basketball players of Belgium